Theodore Gilmore Bilbo (October 13, 1877 – August 21, 1947) was an American politician who twice served as governor of Mississippi (1916–1920, 1928–1932) and later was elected a U.S. Senator (1935–1947). A lifelong Democrat, he was a filibusterer whose name was synonymous with white supremacy – like many Southern Democrats of his era, Bilbo believed that black people were inferior; he defended segregation, and was a member of the Ku Klux Klan, the US's most notable white supremacist terrorist organization. He also published a pro-segregation work, Take Your Choice: Separation or Mongrelization.

Bilbo was educated in rural Hancock County (later Pearl River County). He attended Peabody Normal College in Nashville, Tennessee, and Vanderbilt University Law School. After teaching school, he attained admission to the bar in 1906 and practiced in Poplarville. He then served in the Mississippi State Senate for four years, from 1908 to 1912.

Bilbo overcame accusations of accepting bribes and won an election for lieutenant governor, a position he held from 1912 to 1916. In 1915, he was elected governor and served from 1916 to 1920. During this term, he earned accolades for enacting Progressive measures such as compulsory school attendance and increased spending on public works projects. He was an unsuccessful candidate for the United States House of Representatives in 1920.

Bilbo won the election to the governorship again in 1927 and served from 1928 to 1932. During this term, Bilbo caused controversy by attempting to move the University of Mississippi from Oxford to Jackson. In another controversy, he aided Democratic nominee Al Smith in the 1928 presidential election by spreading the story that Republican nominee Herbert Hoover had socialized with a black woman; Mississippi voters, considering whether to maintain their allegiance to the Democratic Party in light of Smith's Catholicism and support for the repeal of Prohibition, largely remained with Smith after Bilbo's appeal to racism.

In 1930, under Governor Bilbo, Mississippi introduced a sales tax—the first American state to do so. In 1934 Bilbo won election to a seat in the United States Senate. In the Senate, Bilbo maintained his support for segregation and white supremacy; he was also attracted to the ideas of the black separatist movement, considering it a potentially viable method of maintaining segregation. He proposed resettling the 12 million American blacks to Africa. In his second term, he made anti-black racism a major theme. Regarding economic policy, he moved away from support for the New Deal and increasingly joined the Conservative Coalition. Opposing Roosevelt, he became isolationist in foreign policy and opposed labor unions. He was the leader in fighting FDR's Fair Employment Practice Committee and helped kill the nomination of liberal Aubrey Willis Williams to head the Rural Electrification Administration. Although reelected to a third term in 1946, liberals led by Glen H. Taylor blocked his seating based on denying the vote to blacks and accepting bribes. By the time he died (without taking his seat), the national media had made him the symbol of racism.<ref>Charles Pope Smith, Theodore G. Bilbo's Senatorial Career. The Final Years: 1941–1947" (PhD dissertation, The University of Southern Mississippi, 1983), p. 249.</ref>

Bilbo died in a New Orleans hospital while undergoing cancer treatment and was buried at Juniper Grove Cemetery in Poplarville. Bilbo was of short stature, frequently wore bright, flashy clothing to draw attention to himself, and was nicknamed "The Man" because he tended to refer to himself in the third person.

Education and family background
On October 13, 1877, Bilbo was born in the small town of Juniper Grove in Hancock (later Pearl River) County. His parents, Obedience "Beedy" (née Wallis or Wallace) and James Oliver Bilbo, were of Scotch-Irish descent; James was a farmer and veteran of the Confederate States Army who rose from poverty during Theodore Bilbo's early years to become Vice President of the Poplarville National Bank. Theodore Bilbo obtained a scholarship to attend Peabody Normal College in Nashville, Tennessee, and later attended Vanderbilt University Law School, but did not graduate from either. He also taught school and worked at a drug store during his legal studies. During his teaching career, Bilbo was accused of being overly familiar with a female student. He was admitted to the bar in Tennessee in 1906, and began a law practice in Poplarville, Mississippi, the following year.

Although he had been admitted to the senior class at Vanderbilt, he left without graduating. He was accused of cheating in academics, but he likely left school for financial reasons. Though these accusations never rose to the level of formal charges, they helped create the perception that Bilbo was profligate and dishonest.

State Senate
On November 5, 1907, Bilbo was elected to the Mississippi State Senate. He served there from 1908 to 1912. In 1909 he attended non-credit summer courses at the University of Michigan Law School when the legislature was not in session.Larry Thomas Balsamo, Theodore G. Bilbo and Mississippi politics, 1877–1932, 1967, p. 36.

In 1910, Bilbo attracted national attention in a bribery scandal. After the death of U.S. Senator James Gordon, the legislature was deadlocked in choosing between LeRoy Percy or former Governor James K. Vardaman as Gordon's successor. After 58 ballots, on February 28, Bilbo was one of several candidates to break the stalemate by switching his vote to Percy, who won 87–82. Bilbo told a grand jury the next day that he had accepted a $645 bribe from L. C. Dulaney but that he had done so as part of a private investigation. The State Senate voted 28–10 to expel him from office, falling one vote short of the  majority needed. The Senate passed a resolution – which did not require a  majority – calling him "unfit to sit with honest, upright men in a respectable legislative body."

During his subsequent campaign for lieutenant governor, Bilbo commented on Washington Dorsey Gibbs, a state senator from Yazoo City. Gibbs was insulted and broke his cane over Bilbo's head during an ensuing skirmish. But Bilbo's campaign was successful, and he served as lieutenant governor from 1912 to 1916. One of his first acts as lieutenant governor was to remove from the records the resolution calling him "unfit to sit with honest men."

First governorship
After serving as Lieutenant Governor of Mississippi for four years, Bilbo was elected governor in 1915. Cresswell (2006) argues that in his first term (1916–20), Bilbo had "the most successful administration" of all the governors who served between 1877 and 1917, putting state finances in order and supporting Progressive measures such as compulsory school attendance, a new charity hospital, and a board of bank examiners.

In his first term, his Progressive program was largely implemented. He was known as "Bilbo the Builder" because he authorized a state highway system, as well as limestone crushing plants, new dormitories at the Old Soldiers' Home, a tuberculosis hospital, and his work on eradication of the South American tick.

In 1916 he pushed through a law eliminating public hangings. The Haynes Report, a call to national action in response to race riots throughout the summer of 1919, pointed to Bilbo as exemplifying the collective failure of the states to stop or even prosecute thousands of lawless executions over several decades. Before the mob lynching of John Hartfield in Ellisville, Mississippi, on June 26, 1919, according to the report, Bilbo said in a speech:
 Hartfield had purportedly entered into a consensual relationship with a local white woman; when the relationship was discovered, he fled but was tracked and kidnapped by a lynch mob of racists from the area. Hartfield was held and beaten before ultimately being publicly murdered by hanging for his "crimes" without trial. The murderers burned and desecrated his remains, allegedly selling parts of his corpse as souvenirs.“Negro Still Being Chased Over Country". Hattiesburg American. June 18, 1919. Retrieved March 18, 2021. All this, including the premeditated murder, was done with the overt support of local authorities and was announced in the local papers the day prior.

Congressional campaign and paternity suit

The state constitution prohibited governors from having successive terms, so Bilbo chose to run for a seat in the U.S. House of Representatives in 1918. During the campaign, a bout of Texas fever broke out among cattle; Bilbo supported a program to dip cattle in insecticide to kill the ticks carrying the fever. Mississippi farmers were generally not happy about the idea, and Bilbo lost the primary to Paul B. Johnson Sr.

Lee M. Russell, then Governor, had served as Bilbo's lieutenant governor and was being sued by his former secretary, who accused him of breach of promise and of seducing and impregnating her. She had undergone an abortion that prevented her from having further children. Russell asked Bilbo to convince the woman not to sue. Bilbo was unsuccessful, but Russell's secretary was also unsuccessful in her suit.

Judge Edwin R. Holmes asked Bilbo to submit documents pertinent to the case. Bilbo refused and was later caught hiding in a barn to avoid a subpoena. Subsequently, he was sentenced to 30 days in prison for contempt of court and served ten days behind bars. He also lost his bid to return to the governorship in 1923.

Second governorship

In 1927, Bilbo was elected governor again after winning the Democratic primary election over Governor Dennis Murphree, who had succeeded to the top position from the lieutenant governorship on the death of Governor Henry L. Whitfield. Bilbo criticized Murphree for calling out the Mississippi National Guard to prevent a lynching in Jackson, declaring that no black person was worthy of protection by the Guard.

He also tried to move the University of Mississippi from Oxford to Jackson, although the idea never came to fruition.

During the 1928 presidential election, Bilbo helped Al Smith (D) from New York to carry the state by a large margin. Conservative, Protestant Democratic voters were considering abandoning Smith because he was Catholic and supported the repeal of prohibition. Bilbo spread the rumor that Republican candidate Herbert Hoover had socialized with a black woman, which helped keep southern Democrats in Smith's column.

In 1929, Thomas G. Gunter of Benton County, Mississippi, was convicted of the murder of his son-in-law, Marlin Drew, on the testimony of his seven-year-old granddaughter, Dorothy Louise. He was sentenced to 5 years in prison.

Three months later, after his daughter Pearl gave birth to her fourth child, she confessed that she had killed Marlin during an argument over the paternity of her then-unborn child and requested that her 63-year-old father be pardoned. Pearl said she had coached Dorothy Louise to implicate her father. She added it was always her intention to tell the truth after the birth of her baby and that she could not bear the thought of it beginning its life in prison. Governor Bilbo then granted Gunter a 90-day suspension of sentence as Pearl was bound over for an appearance before the Grand Jury. After the Grand Jury indicted Pearl for murder and perjury, Pearl was arraigned and pled guilty. The judge, however, used his statutory discretion and suspended Pearl's sentence.

When Gunter's 90-day suspension expired in February 1930, the governor denied his application for a pardon and ordered him to return to prison. The governor stated, "Somebody ought to be in the penitentiary all the time for the murder of a sleeping man. If Judge Pegram does not believe Mrs. Drew is guilty enough to serve her term, then the man convicted of her murder will have to serve his term. Husbands ought to have some protection." Gunter, however, refused to return to the penitentiary, and as of February 1931, when an account of the case was written, he and Pearl had fled the state of Mississippi.

Firing the professors
In 1930, Bilbo convened a meeting of the State Board of Universities and Colleges to approve his plans to dismiss 179 faculty members. Appearing before reporters after the meeting, he announced, "Boys, we've just hung up a new record. We've bounced three college presidents and made three new ones in the record time of two hours. And that's just the beginning of what's going to happen." The presidents of the University of Mississippi ("Ole Miss"), Mississippi A&M (later Mississippi State University), and the Mississippi State College for Women were all fired and replaced, respectively, by a realtor, a press agent, and a recent B.A. degree-recipient. The Dean of the Medical School at Ole Miss was replaced by "a man who once had a course in dentistry."

The Association of American Universities and the Southern Association of Colleges and Secondary Schools then suspended recognition of degrees from all four of Mississippi's state colleges. The American Medical Association voted to cancel the state's college of medicine accreditation.

The American Association of University Professors (AAUP), meeting in Cleveland, passed a resolution that the remaining Mississippi professors would "be regarded as retired members of the profession" after finding that their dismissals had been made "for political considerations and without concern for the welfare of the students."

During the crisis, Bilbo was burned in effigy by students at Ole Miss, but he was unconcerned about the state's image. He made national headlines by giving an interview while "sitting in a tub of hot water, soap in one hand, washrag in the other, and a cigar in his mouth." The lack of recognition continued until "satisfactory evidence of improved conditions" was provided to the AAUP and the other institutions in 1932.

In his final year of office, Bilbo and the legislature were at a stalemate when he refused to sign their tax bills, and the legislature refused to approve them. At the end of his term, the State of Mississippi was effectively bankrupt. The state treasury had only $1,326.57 in its coffers, and the state was $11.5 million in debt.

Bilbo, whose actions had halted U.S. Department of Agriculture funding of the agricultural school at Mississippi State, was hired as a "consultant on public relations" for the USDA for a short time. He clipped newspaper articles for a high salary, a reward from Senator Pat Harrison for Bilbo's campaign support. Pundits dubbed him the "Pastemaster General." Soon, Bilbo made plans to run for the U.S. Senate seat held by Hubert Stephens.

U.S. Senate

In 1934, Bilbo defeated Stephens to win a seat in the United States Senate. There he spoke against "farmer murderers," "poor-folks haters," "shooters of widows and orphans," "international well-poisoners," "charity hospital destroyers," "spitters on our heroic veterans," "rich enemies of our public schools," "private bankers 'who ought to come out in the open and let folks see what they're doing'," "European debt-cancelers," "unemployment makers," pacifists, Communists, munitions manufacturers, and "skunks who steal Gideon Bibles from hotel rooms."

In Washington, Bilbo feuded with Mississippi senior Senator Pat Harrison. Bilbo, whose base was among tenant farmers, hated the upper-class Harrison, who represented the rich planters and merchants. The feud started in 1936 when Harrison nominated Judge Holmes for the Fifth Circuit Court of Appeals. Bilbo disliked Holmes, dating back to the Russell case, and spoke against him for five hours. Bilbo was the only Senator to vote "no," and Holmes was confirmed.

Later that year, Harrison faced a primary challenge from former Governor Mike Conner. Bilbo supported Conner. Bilbo's former law partner Stewart C. "Sweep Clean" Broom, campaigned for Harrison. Harrison won reelection.

When the Senate majority leader's job opened up in 1937, Harrison ran and faced a close contest with Kentucky's Alben Barkley. Harrison's campaign manager asked Bilbo to consider voting for Harrison. Bilbo said he would vote for Harrison only if Harrison asked him personally. When asked if he would make the personal appeal to Bilbo, Harrison replied, "Tell the son of a bitch I wouldn't speak to him even if it meant the presidency of the United States." Harrison lost by one vote, 37-to-38, and his reputation as the Senator who wouldn't speak to his home-state colleague remained intact. Bilbo had taken revenge by voting against his fellow Mississippian.

Bilbo's outspoken support of segregation and white supremacy was controversial in the Senate. Attracted by the ideas of black separatists such as Marcus Garvey, Bilbo proposed an amendment to the federal work-relief bill on June 6, 1938, which would have deported twelve million black Americans to Liberia at federal expense to relieve unemployment. Bilbo wrote a book advocating the idea. Garvey praised him in return, saying that Bilbo had "done wonderfully well for the Negro." But Thomas W. Harvey, a senior Universal Negro Improvement Association and African Communities League leader in the US, distanced himself from Bilbo because of his racist speeches.

Bilbo continued to pursue the idea of repatriating African Americans, with support from black separatists such as Mittie Maude Lena Gordon, founder of the Peace Movement of Ethiopia. Gordon collaborated with Bilbo on his proposed legislation, the Greater Liberia Bill, and directed the Peace Movement of Ethiopia in a national grassroots campaign in support. On April 24, 1939, Bilbo presented the bill to the Senate. It proposed relocating African Americans to Liberia and further suggested the purchase of 400,000 square miles of West African territory from France and Britain, credited on debt form World War I, for the emigrants. The movement was to be funded through federal expenditures, initially suggesting $1 billion, and encouraged support from "any country in Europe that owes us a war debt". Black Americans between the ages of 21 and 50 would receive material aid, including a 50-acre land grant, and financial assistance for one year after reallocating. The bill failed to generate enough support and was unsuccessful.

The Democrats assigned Bilbo to the least essential Senate committee on the governance of the District of Columbia to limit his influence. Bilbo, however, used his position to advance his white supremacist views. Bilbo was against giving any vote to district residents, especially as the district's black population was increasing because of the Great Migration. After re-election, he advanced to sufficient seniority to chair the committee, 1945–1947. He also served on the Pensions Committee, chairing it 1942–1945.

In his 1940 re-election bid, President Roosevelt praised Bilbo as "a real friend of liberal government." Bilbo, in turn, boasted himself as being "...100 percent for Roosevelt ... and the New Deal."
In the 1930s, Bilbo supported Democratic President Franklin Roosevelt's New Deal. He became known as the "Redneck Liberal." After 1940, however, he moved steadily to the right regarding foreign policy, economic policy, and the rights of workers and unions. He became isolationist and opposed the draft and preparations for war. He increasingly voted with the Conservative Coalition that controlled domestic policy. He switched from a supporter to an opponent of labor unions. He ridiculed blacks, Jews and Italians and helped defeat the renewal of Roosevelt's Fair Employment Practice Committee, which tried to abolish job discrimination based on race or ethnicity. He always favored agriculture, and he owned a large farm himself. As the war began, he complained that Roosevelt's policies were driving up wages and reducing his profits. He supported programs sought by large farmers.

Bilbo revealed his membership in the Ku Klux Klan in an interview on the radio program Meet the Press, saying, "No man can leave the Klan. He takes an oath not to do that. Once a Ku Klux, always a Ku Klux."

He was a prominent participant in the lengthy southern Democratic filibuster of the Costigan-Wagner anti-lynching bill before the Senate in 1938, during which he argued, "If you succeed in the passage of this bill, you will open the floodgates of hell in the South. Raping, mobbing, lynching, race riots, and crime will be increased a thousandfold".

Bilbo denounced Richard Wright's autobiography, Black Boy (1945), on the Senate floor. "Its purpose is to plant the seeds of devilment and trouble-breeding in the days to come in the mind and heart of every American Negro ... It is the dirtiest, filthiest, lousiest, most obscene piece of writing that I have ever seen in print."

Bilbo was outspoken in saying that blacks should not be allowed to vote anywhere in the United States, regardless of the Fourteenth and Fifteenth amendments to the Constitution. Black World War II veterans complained of longstanding disfranchisement in the South, which Mississippi had achieved in 1890 by changes to its constitution related to electoral and voter registration rules, which the other Confederate states and Oklahoma followed with similar changes through 1910, most of which survived court challenges. Bilbo's campaign was accused of provoking violence related to voting.

In 1946, he wrote to General MacArthur, head of the Allied occupation of Japan, that the Japanese should "all be sterilized."

During the 1946 Democratic Senate primary in Mississippi, his last race, Bilbo was the subject of a series of attacks by journalist Hodding Carter in his paper, the Greenville Delta Democrat-Times. Dismayed that the Supreme Court had ruled that white primaries were unconstitutional, he urged his white supporters to prevent black citizens from voting. At least half of all black citizens were prevented from voting in the primary due to threats of violence. He won that primary against three other opponents with 51.0 percent of the vote. As usual, Bilbo faced no Republican opposition in the 1946 general election. Based on a request by liberal Democratic Senator Glen H. Taylor of Idaho, the newly elected Republican majority in the United States Senate refused to seat Bilbo for the term to which he was elected because of his speeches. He was believed to have incited violence against blacks who wanted to vote in the South. In addition, a committee found that he had taken bribes—one contractor gave him a Cadillac for Christmas in 1946. A filibuster by Southerners threatened to delay the seating of all the new Senators. It was resolved when a supporter proposed that Bilbo's credentials remain on the table while he returned to Mississippi to seek medical treatment for oral cancer.

Death

Bilbo retired to his "Dream House" estate in Poplarville, Mississippi, where he wrote and published a summary of his racial ideas entitled Take Your Choice: Separation or Mongrelization (Dream House Publishing Company, 1947). His house, which served as the eponym and office of his publishing company, burned down in late fall that year, with the fire consuming many copies of the book.

Bilbo died at sixty-nine in New Orleans, Louisiana. On his deathbed, he summoned Leon Louis, the editor of the black newspaper Negro South to make a statement:

His funeral at Juniper Grove Cemetery in Poplarville was attended by five thousand mourners, including the governor and the junior senator. A bronze statue of Bilbo was placed in the rotunda of the Mississippi State Capitol building. It was relocated to another room now frequently used by the Legislative Black Caucus, and some members used the statue's outstretched arm as a coat rack. The statue was moved to storage in 2021.

According to Charles Pope Smith, when he died:Theodore G. Bilbo was perhaps the most controversial public figure on the national scene....The extremism of his pronouncements on race relations had polarized much of the country....To the vast majority of southern whites Bilbo had become the leading spokesman in the fight to preserve that section's structure of racial segregation from those who wanted to bring about racially equality. To liberal whites and blacks, on the other hand, Bilbo was America's most vicious race-baiter.

In popular culture
Bilbo was satirized multiple times in popular culture.
 In 1946 he was the subject of Bob and Adrienne Claiborne's song Listen Mr. Bilbo (1946), sung by Pete Seeger.
 Jack Webb devoted an episode of his crusading 1946 radio show One Out of Seven to attacking Bilbo's racial views. He dramatized extracts from Bilbo's speeches and letters attacking Negroes, "Dagoes" (Italians), and Jews, while asserting after each extract some variation of " ... but Senator Bilbo is an honorable man. We do not intend to prove otherwise", a reference to Marc Antony's funeral oration in Shakespeare's play Julius Caesar.
 In 1947 he was the subject of blues song Bilbo Is Dead by Andrew Tibbs.
 Bilbo is the subject of the talking blues song Talking Bilbo by Lee Hays, included in the ten-disc compilation Songs for Political Action curated by Bear Family Records.
 He was also mentioned in the 1947 Gregory Peck film Gentleman's Agreement as an exemplar of bigotry.
 In 2001, Andy Duncan published the short story "Senator Bilbo", which conflated Theodore Bilbo's racial attitudes into a Lord of the Rings short story, about a hobbit Senator post the LOTR trilogy.

See also 

References
Notes

Further reading
 Boulard, Garry, "'The Man' vs. 'The Quisling': Theodore Bilbo, Hodding Carter and the 1946 Democratic Primary," Journal of Mississippi History,1989, 51, 201–217.
 Cresswell, Stephen. Rednecks, Redeemers, And Race: Mississippi After Reconstruction, 1877–1917], 2006 – excerpt and text search]
 Gehrke, Pat J. "The Southern Association of Teachers of Speech v. Senator Theodore Bilbo: Restraint and Indirection as Rhetorical Strategies." Southern Communication Journal 2007, 72, 95–104.
 Giroux, Vincent A., Jr. "The Rise of Theodore G. Bilbo (1908–1932)," Journal of Mississippi History 1981 43(3): 180–209,
 Green, Adwin Wigfall. The Man Bilbo (LSU Press 1963), scholarly biography; online
 Kirwan, Albert D. Revolt of the rednecks: Mississippi politics, 1876–1925 (1951) online
 
 Morgan, Chester M. Redneck Liberal: Theodore G. Bilbo and the New Deal,'' (Louisiana State U. Press, 1985). online ), scholarly biography
 Smith, Charles Pope. "Theodore G. Bilbo's Senatorial Career. The Final Years: 1941–1947" (PhD dissertation, The University of Southern Mississippi, 1983)

External links

 Theodore Gilmore Bilbo, Take Your Choice: Separation or Mongrelization (1946). A compendium of segregationist arguments.
 
 , Mississippi Department of Archives and History . Details Senate efforts to prevent Bilbo from resuming his seat in 1947.
 Bilbo Family History website
 Theodore G. Bilbo Papers, Special Collections at The University of Southern Mississippi

1877 births
1947 deaths
20th-century far-right politicians in the United States
American segregationists
American people of Scotch-Irish descent
Deaths from cancer in Louisiana
Deaths from oral cancer
Democratic Party governors of Mississippi
Democratic Party United States senators from Mississippi
History of racism in Mississippi
Illeists
American Ku Klux Klan members
Lieutenant Governors of Mississippi
Democratic Party Mississippi state senators
Peabody College alumni
People from Pearl River County, Mississippi
Politics and race in the United States
University of Michigan Law School alumni
Vanderbilt University Law School alumni